Cristofano Berardi (18th century) was an Italian engraver. Although born in Bologna, he is known for his vedute of France. He trained with the Florentine engraver Giuseppe Zocchi.

References

Artists from Bologna
Italian engravers
18th-century Italian people
Year of death unknown
Year of birth unknown